The Red Shaver is a sex linked breed of chicken developed in Canada. Pullets are reddish-brown in colour with white underfeathers, while males are white with a few red markings on the feathers. They are a hardy, dual-purpose breed laying brown eggs and dressing out between three and five pounds. They have a reputation of being a quiet breed. Red Shaver chickens are used most frequently in small flocks for small farms.

Eggs
Red shaver hens can lay from 305 to 315 eggs a year, and are reported to be prolific producers of large brown eggs. One four-year-old Red Shaver chicken in Ottawa was credited with laying an egg with a mass of 143 grams, which is almost three times the size of a standard medium egg (Typically a medium egg is 49 g, a jumbo egg is 70 g).

Meat
Body weight at 18 weeks is about 3 lbs., and after one year of laying weight between 4 to 5 lbs.

See also
 List of chicken breeds
 egg sizing

References 

Chicken breeds
Chicken breeds originating in Canada